Choi Soo-jong (born December 18, 1962) is a South Korean actor. Choi made his debut in 1987 as a young actor in the TV soap opera ‘Love Tree’. He has appeared in movies, on television and as an MC for various award shows. He has received worldwide recognition for his leading roles in several highly successful shows.  Most recently he garnered acclaim for his portrayals of the principal characters in the Korean historical dramas Emperor of the Sea playing the role of Jang Bogo, and as the title character Dae Joyoung in the epic series Dae Jo Yeong (TV series).

Career
When reflecting on his more than twenty years as an actor, Choi said "To an actor, fame is short, but acting is long."

As a public figure and social activist, Choi Soo-jong has sought to project an image of integrity and wholesomeness.  His fidelity to his wife and dedication to his role as father and husband are widely discussed in the media, although he strives to retain his family's privacy.  Choi also openly discusses his commitment to clean living through regular exercise and healthy eating. Despite his advancing age, Choi continues to accept physically challenging roles that require horseback riding, combat and swordsmanship, and exposure to extreme temperatures.  His youthful appearance and physical fitness allow Choi to play characters much younger than his actual age.

Despite Choi's image of integrity and health, in 2007 his career was briefly overshadowed by scandal.  In a series of news stories, it was revealed that several high-profile Korean actors had falsified their academic credentials. Choi was among those whose educational background on his resume proved to be exaggerated and included untrue information. Choi tearfully apologized for misleading the public.

In 2010, Choi was cast in a lead role in Legend of the Patriots, a remake of the 1975 series Comrades.  According to a press release from KBS, Choi found acting in a war drama even more challenging than the historical dramas he is known for.  When asked why he chose to pursue the challenging genre of war drama, Choi stated "There is a problem though that the more I act, the more I become greedy for acting. What do I have to do from now on? Anyway, I want to remain as a good actor as I put more effort into managing myself"."

On January 3, 2022, Choi was appointed as the new president of the Korean Broadcasting Actors Association.

Personal life
Choi is married to actress Ha Hee Ra, a Hwagyo. They have two children together: son Min-seo (1999) and daughter Yoon-seo (2000). Choi Soo-jong and Ha Hee Ra's happy marriage is well-known in Korea.  When Ha was pregnant, Choi did the housework, cooked, and let her rest, a fact that has made Choi very popular with Korean women and jokingly scorned by Korean men. In a television interview in early 2010, Choi's wife Ha stated her husband is a better housekeeper than she is.  Choi is frequently seen text messaging and making phone calls with his wife Ha Hee Ra while filming and was even documented doing so in the television special for Emperor of the Sea.

Choi has a reputation amongst co-stars as funny and bright.  He is known as a jokester on the set that has earned him the title "NG Mawang" (NG Master). When he makes an NG (blooper), he attempts to make light of his error.

In his free time, Choi enjoys playing soccer on Sunday mornings. In 2008,
Choi announced that he would also begin studying English in his spare time.

Social activities
When not filming, Choi and his wife also are involved with charitable projects both jointly and separately. They contribute regularly to charitable causes in addition to actively volunteering for causes such as disabled children and were actively involved in the cleaning up after the massive oil spill in Korea in 2007. In the first half of 2009, Choi and Ha were selected to be the ambassadors for a worldwide campaign against tuberculosis. Also in 2009, Choi and Ha became goodwill ambassadors of the National Museum of Korea and sponsored a project to provide 50,000 Korean language guidebooks for visitors to the American Museum of Natural History in New York.

Additionally, in December 2008, Choi was one of five celebrities appointed as a goodwill ambassador to the Korean capital Seoul.
As a member of the "Fabulous Five," Choi was chosen to publicize the international appeal of the city.   In June 2009, Choi Soo-jong and six other high-profile actors waived their fees to teach master acting classes at Im Kwon-taek Film and Art College of Dongseo University.

Filmography

Films
 Obedience (documentary, 2016)
 Iron Bag, Mr. Woo-soo (2012)
 The Man Who Cannot Kiss (1994)
 Man Upstairs, Woman Downstairs (1992)
 The Night Full of Stars (1991)
 Do You Like the Afternoon After the Rain? (1991)
 To You Again (1991)
 You Know What, It's A Secret (1990)
 Superman Yiljimae (1990)
 Puppy Love (1988)
 A Young Punch (1988)

Television
 Record of Youth (Cameo) (tvN,2020)
My Only One (KBS2, 2018)
Japanese Invasion of Korea 1592 (2016)
Into the Flames (TV Chosun, 2014)
You Are the Boss! (MBC, 2013) (cameo)
Dream of the Emperor (KBS1, 2012)
Drama Special: For Her Son (KBS2, 2011) 
The President (KBS2, 2010)
Legend of the Patriots (KBS1, 2010)
Korean Ghost Stories: Curse of the Sajin Sword (KBS2, 2008)
Dae Jo Yeong (KBS1, 2006)
Emperor of the Sea (KBS2, 2004)
War of the Roses (MBC, 2004)
On the Prairie (KBS2, 2003)
Man of the Sun, Lee Je-ma (KBS2, 2002)
Taejo Wang Geon (KBS1, 2000)
Did You Ever Love? (KBS2, 1999)
People's House (KBS1, 1999)
Beautiful Secret (KBS2, 1999)
Legend of Ambition (KBS2, 1998)
When She Beckons (KBS2, 1997)
Fireworks (MBC, 1997)
Three Guys and Three Girls (MBC, 1997) (cameo)
First Love (KBS2, 1996)
Blowing of the Wind (KBS2, 1995)
Last Lovers (MBC, 1994)
Rival of History (KBS1, 1994)
Ambition (MBC, 1994)
Pilot (MBC, 1993)
Hot River (MBC, 1993)
Drama Game (KBS2  1993)
Best Theater (MBC, 1993)
Bong Yi-jeon (KBS2, 1993)
Sons and Daughters (MBC, 1992-1993)
Chunwon Yi Kwang-su (MBC, 1992)
Jealousy (MBC, 1992)
City People (MBC, 1992)
The Family (KBS2, 1991-1992)
Happiness Dictionary (MBC, 1991)
Chunsa Na Woon-gyu (MBC, 1991)
Seoul Earthenware Pot (KBS1, 1990)
Daewongun (MBC, 1990)
Love's Open Every Hour (MBC, 1990)
Love Rains Clouds (MBC, 1989)
Sir (MBC, 1989)
Principal Investigator (MBC, 1989)
The Memoirs of Lady Hyegyeong (MBC, 1988-1989)
Queen Inhyeon (MBC, 1988)
Love Tree (KBS, 1987-1990)

Variety show
 You'll Know when You Leave (2023; New Year's specials) with Do Kyung-wan  
 Second House (2022–2023; Season 1–2) with Ha Hee-ra 
 This is Wild 3 (2022) 
 (2020)
 (January 2020–May 2020)
Choi Soo-jong Show (2003)

Hosting

Awards and nominations

References

External links

1962 births
Living people
South Korean male film actors
South Korean male television actors
South Korean Presbyterians
Male actors from Seoul
20th-century South Korean male actors
21st-century South Korean male actors